Galen Hadley (born March 9, 1942) is an American politician, accountant, and academic who served as a member of the Nebraska Legislature from 2009 to 2017. He served previously as mayor of Kearney, Nebraska.

Early life and education 


Hadley's father was a salesman and his mother was a housewife. He also has a younger brother and a younger sister. Hadley graduated from Lincoln High School and studied at the University of Nebraska–Lincoln. He graduated in 1964 with a bachelor's degree in accounting. While he was working in Denver, he earned his master's from the University of Colorado Boulder through their night program. Eventually he returned to the University of Nebraska at Lincoln and earned his PhD in accounting.

Career 
Haldey taught and held higher positions at different colleges including the University of Nebraska at Kearney and the University of South Dakota. From 2004 to 2006, Hadley was the mayor of Kearney, Nebraska.

Hadley was elected in 2008, defeating Jim George, to represent the 37th Nebraska legislative district. In 2012, he defeated Josiah H. Woodward and Mike McShea to win a second term.

References

1942 births
Living people
Mayors of places in Nebraska
Nebraska state senators
Speakers of the Nebraska Legislature
21st-century American politicians
Politicians from Lincoln, Nebraska
People from Kearney, Nebraska